Melayro Chakewno Jalaino Bogarde (born 28 May 2002) is a Dutch footballer who plays as a centre-back for Eerste Divisie club PEC Zwolle, on loan from 1899 Hoffenheim.

Club career
Bogarde joined the youth team of 1899 Hoffenheim from the Feyenoord Academy in 2018. On 30 May 2020, he made his professional debut for Hoffenheim in the Bundesliga, starting in the away match against Mainz 05.

On 14 January 2022, Bogarde was loaned to Eredivisie club Groningen for the rest of the season.

International career
Bogarde began his international career with the Netherlands under-15 national team in 2017, before playing for the under-16 team until 2018. In 2019, he was included in the Dutch squad for the 2019 UEFA European Under-17 Championship in the Republic of Ireland. The Netherlands won the tournament, defeating Italy 4–2 in the final, with Bogarde appearing in all six matches and later selected by the UEFA technical observers for the team of the tournament. As a result, the Netherlands under-17 team qualified for the 2019 FIFA U-17 World Cup in Brazil later that year. Bogarde was included in the Dutch squad for the tournament, in which he made three appearances as the Netherlands finished fourth.

Personal life
Bogarde was born in Rotterdam, and is of Surinamese descent. His uncle, Winston Bogarde, is a former footballer who was capped for the Netherlands, while his younger brother Lamare is an Aston Villa player and Dutch youth international.

Honours
Netherlands U17
UEFA European Under-17 Championship: 2019
Individual
 UEFA European Under-17 Championship Team of the Tournament: 2019

References

External links
 
 
 
 

2002 births
Living people
Footballers from Rotterdam
Dutch footballers
Netherlands youth international footballers
Netherlands under-21 international footballers
Association football defenders
TSG 1899 Hoffenheim players
FC Groningen players
Bundesliga players
Regionalliga players
Eredivisie players
Dutch expatriate footballers
Expatriate footballers in Germany
Dutch expatriate sportspeople in Germany
Dutch sportspeople of Surinamese descent